Ahmed Imamović (born 1971) is a Bosnian film director, film producer and screenwriter.

He directed the controversial film Go West and the short film 10 Minutes.

Filmography

Film

Awards and nominations

References

External links

Living people
European Film Awards winners (people)
Bosnia and Herzegovina film producers
Bosnia and Herzegovina film directors
Bosnia and Herzegovina screenwriters
Male screenwriters
1971 births
Bosnia and Herzegovina male writers